Yeom Sang-seop (1897–1963) was a South Korean novelist and freedom fighter. He was an early pioneer of modern narrative in Korea and a "writer of the period of dissatisfaction". In this role, he was one of the first naturalistic and realistic writers in Korean literature. His role in the resistance to Japanese colonialism resulted in his arrest.

Early life
Yom was born in 1897 in Seoul and began his high school level studies in Japan in 1912. After one semester, however, he dropped out and began a literary magazine with fellow writer . At about this time, he became involved with the March 1st Movement and began to plan a rally in Osaka, Japan. For these efforts, he was arrested and put in prison but was subsequently acquitted on appeal.

Career 
In 1920, he returned to Korea and took a position as a reporter at the Dong-A Ilbo newspaper. He also joined a literary movement associated with a cultural magazine called . During the 1920s, he became a proponent of a national literature for Korea and was one of the few writers who did not write in Japanese or publish fawning articles at the height of Japan's colonization. In 1928 he married Kim Yong-ok and joined the Chosun Ilbo as main editor of the Arts and Science section of that paper.

Perhaps his most famous work is Three Generations, a 472-page novel which was published in 1931. As was common at the time, the novel was published in serial format, in the Chosun Ilbo. The novel was not initially recognized as important and was not published as a book until 1948. In Three Generations, he calmly depicts the Korean people living in the Colonial Era. The central figure of his observation in Three Generations is, so to speak, the lives of intellectuals and urban middle class families living in the 1930s.

In 1946, following World War II, he became the Editor-in-Chief of the Kyunghyang Shinmun. At the outbreak of the Korean War in 1950, he was appointed an officer in the Navy and served in a journalistic capacity at naval headquarters.

He died of cancer on March 14, 1963, at the age of sixty-seven.

Selected works
 Three Generations
 Fig (무화과)
 Blow (취우)
 Tree Frog in the Specimen Room (표본실의 청개구리)
 Two Bankrupt (두 파산)
 Bending (절곡)
 The Ruins (얼룩진 시대 풍경)
 Out of the Blue (만세전)
 Dying (임종)

In English translation
 Three Generations
 On the Eve of the Uprising (in the collection On the Eve of the Uprising and Other Stories from Colonial Korea)

Awards

  (1954)
 Asia Freedom Literature Prize (1956)
 Korean Academy of the Arts Distinguished Service Award
 March First Cultural Award (1962)

References

1897 births
1963 deaths
Korean novelists
20th-century novelists
Keio University alumni
Paju Yeom clan